The NWA Florida Bahamas Championship was a title that existed in Championship Wrestling from Florida from 1982 until 1987. It was also known as the NWA Bahama Island Championship.

Title history

Footnotes

See also
Ring Warriors
National Wrestling Alliance

References

Championship Wrestling from Florida championships
National Wrestling Alliance championships
Professional wrestling in Florida
National Wrestling Alliance state wrestling championships